Elvezia Michel-Baldini (1887–1963) was a Swiss painter, book illustrator and philanthropist.

References
This article was initially translated from the German Wikipedia.

20th-century Swiss painters
1887 births
1963 deaths
Swiss women painters